Crawfish Lake may refer to:

 Crawfish Lake (Washington)
 Crawfish Lake (Grant County, Oregon)